Jain meditation (dhyāna) has been the central practice of spirituality in Jainism along with the Three Jewels. Jainism holds that emancipation can only be achieved through meditation or Shukla Dhyana. According to Sagarmal Jain, it aims to reach and remain in a state of "pure-self awareness or knowership." Meditation is also seen as realizing the self, taking the soul to complete freedom, beyond any craving, aversion and/or attachment. The practitioner strives to be just a knower-seer (Gyata-Drashta). Jain meditation can be broadly categorized to the auspicious (Dharmya Dhyana and Shukla Dhyana) and inauspicious (Artta and Raudra Dhyana). The 20th century saw the development and spread of new modernist forms of Jain Dhyana, mainly by monks and laypersons of Śvētāmbara Jainism.

Jain meditation is also referred to as Sāmāyika which is done for 48 minutes in peace and silence. A form of this which includes a strong component of scripture study (Svādhyāya) is mainly promoted by the Digambara tradition of Jainism. The word Sāmāyika means "being in the moment of continuous real-time". This act of being conscious of the continual renewal of the universe in general and one's own renewal of the individual living being (Jiva) in particular is the critical first step in the journey towards identification with one's true nature, called the Atman. It is also a method by which one can develop an attitude of harmony and respect towards other humans, animals and nature.

Jains believe meditation has been a core spiritual practice since the teaching of the Tirthankara, Rishabha. All the twenty-four Tirthankaras practiced deep meditation and attained enlightenment. They are all shown in meditative postures in images and idols. Mahavira practiced deep meditation for twelve years and attained enlightenment. The Acaranga Sutra dating to 500 BCE, addresses the meditation system of Jainism in detail. Acharya Bhadrabahu of the 4th century BCE practiced deep Mahaprana meditation for twelve years. Kundakunda of 1st century BCE, opened new dimensions of meditation in Jain tradition through his books such as Samayasāra and Pravachansar. The 8th century Jain philosopher Haribhadra also contributed to the development of Jain yoga through his Yogadṛṣṭisamuccaya, which compares and analyzes various systems of yoga, including Hindu, Buddhist and Jain systems.

There are various common postures for Jain meditation, including Padmasana, Ardh-Padmasana, Vajrasana, Sukhasana, standing, and lying down. The 24 Tirthankaras are always seen in one of these two postures in the Kayotsarga (standing) or Padmasana/Paryankasana (Lotus).

Ancient history
Sagarmal Jain divides the history of Jaina yoga and meditation into five stages, 1. pre-canonical (before sixth century BCE), 2. canonical age (fifth century BCE to fifth century CE), 3. post-canonical (sixth century CE to twelfth century CE), 4. age of tantra and rituals (thirteenth to nineteenth century CE), and 5. modern age (20th century on). The main change in the canonical era was that Jain meditation became influenced by Hindu Yogic traditions. Meditation in early Jain literature is a form of austerity and ascetic practice, while in the late medieval era the practice adopted ideas from other Indian traditions. According to Paul Dundas, this lack of meditative practices in early Jain texts may be because substantial portions of ancient Jain texts were lost.

Pre-canonical 
 

Jains believe all twenty-four Tirthankaras (such as Rishabhanatha) practiced deep meditation, some for years and some for months, and attained enlightenment. All the statues and pictures of Tirthankaras primarily show them in meditative postures. Jain tradition believes that meditation derives from Rishabhanatha, the first tirthankara. Some scholars have pointed to evidence from Mohenjodaro and Harappa (such as the pashupati seal) as proof that a pre-vedic sramanic meditation tradition is very old in ancient India. However, Sagarmal Jain states that it is very difficult to extract the pre-canonical method of Jain meditation from the earliest sources.

The earliest mention of yogic practices appear in early Jain canonical texts like the Acaranga, Sutrakritanga, and Rsibhasita. The Acaranga for example, mentions Trāṭaka (fixed gaze) meditation, Preksha meditation (self-awareness) and Kayotsarga (‘kāyaṃ vosajjamaṇgāre’, giving up the body). The Acaranga also mentions the tapas practice of standing in the heat of the sun (ātāpanā).

The Acaranga sutra, one of the oldest Jain texts, describes the solitary ascetic meditation of Mahavira before attaining Kevala Jnana as follows:Giving up the company of all householders whomsoever, he meditated. Asked, he gave no answer; he went, and did not transgress the right path. (AS 312) In these places was the wise Sramana for thirteen long years; he meditated day and night, exerting himself, undisturbed, strenuously. (AS 333) And Mahavira meditated (persevering) in some posture, without the smallest motion; he meditated in mental concentration on (the things) above, below, beside, free from desires. He meditated free from sin and desire, not attached to sounds or colours; though still an erring mortal (khadmastha), he wandered about, and never acted carelessly.(AS 374-375)After more than twelve years of austerities and meditation, the AS states that Mahavira entered the state of Kevala Jnana while doing shukla dhayana, the highest form of meditation:The Venerable Ascetic Mahavira passed twelve years in this way of life; during the thirteenth year in the second month of summer, in the fourth fortnight, the light (fortnight) of Vaisakha, on its tenth day called Suvrata, in the Muhurta called Vigaya, while the moon was in conjunction with the asterism Uttaraphalguni, when the shadow had turned towards the east, and the first wake was over, outside of the town Grimbhikagrama, on the northern bank of the river Rigupalika, in the field of the householder Samaga, in a north-eastern direction from an old temple, not far from a Sal tree, in a squatting position with joined heels exposing himself to the heat of the sun, with the knees high and the head low, in deep meditation, in the midst of abstract meditation, he reached Nirvana, the complete and full, the unobstructed, unimpeded, infinite and supreme best knowledge and intuition, called Kevala.According to Samani Pratibha Pragya, early Jain texts like the Uttarādhyayana-sūtra and the Āvaśyaka-sūtra are also important sources for early Jain meditation. The Uttarādhyayana-sūtra "offers a systematic presentation of four types of meditative practices such as: meditation (dhyāna), abandonment of the body (kāyotsarga), contemplation (anuprekṣā), and reflection (bhāvanā)." Pragya argues that "we can conclude that Mahāvīra’s method of meditation consisted of perception and concentration in isolated places, concentration that sought to be unaffected by physical surroundings as well as emotions." Pragya also notes that fasting was an important practice done alongside meditation. The intense meditation described in these texts "is an activity that leads to a state of motionlessness, which is a state of inactivity of body, speech and mind, essential for eliminating karma." The Uttarādhyayana-sūtra also describes the practice of contemplation (anuprekṣā).

Another meditation described in the Āvaśyaka-sūtra is meditation on the tīrthaṅkaras.

Canonical 

In this era, the Jain canon was recorded and Jain philosophy systematized. It is clear that Jain meditation and samadhi continued to evolve and to be practiced after the death of Mahavira by figures such as Acharya Bhadrabahu and Chandragupta Maurya, the founder of Maurya Empire who became a Jain monk in old age and a student of Bhadrabahu. It describes Mahavira as practicing intense austerities, fasts (most commonly three days long, as extreme as six months of fasting) and meditations. In one instance he practiced standing meditation for sixteen days and nights. He did this by facing each of the four directions for a period of time, and then turning to face the intermediate directions as well as above and below.

This period also sees the elucidation of the practice of contemplation (anuprekṣā) by Kundakunda's Vārassa-aṇuvekkhā or “Twelve Contemplations” (c. 1st century BCE to 1st century CE). These twelve forms of reflection (bhāvanā) aid in the stopping of the influx of karmas that extend transmigration. These twelve reflections are:

anitya bhāvanā – the transitoriness of the world;
aśaraņa bhāvanā – the helplessness of the soul.
saṃsāra – the pain and suffering implied in transmigration;
aikatva bhāvanā – the inability of another to share one’s suffering and sorrow;
anyatva bhāvanā – the distinctiveness between the body and the soul;
aśuci bhāvanā – the filthiness of the body;
āsrava bhāvanā – influx of karmic matter;
saṃvara bhāvanā – stoppage of karmic matter;
nirjarā bhāvanā – gradual shedding of karmic matter;
loka bhāvanā – the form and divisions of the universe and the nature of the conditions prevailing in the different regions – heavens, hells, and the like;
bodhidurlabha bhāvanā – the extreme difficulty in obtaining human birth and, subsequently, in attaining true faith; and
dharma bhāvanā – the truth promulgated by Lord Jina.

In his Niyamasara, Acarya Kundakunda, also describes yoga bhakti—devotion to the path to liberation—as the highest form of devotion.

The Sthananga Sutra (c. 2nd century BCE) gives a summary of four main types of meditation (dhyana) or concentrated thought. The first two are mental or psychological states in which a person may become fully immersed and are causes of bondage. The other two are pure states of meditation and conduct, which are causes of emancipation. They are:

 Arta-Dhyana, "a mental condition of suffering, agony and anguish." Usually caused by thinking about an object of desire or a painful ailment.
 Raudra-Dhyana, associated with cruelty, aggressive and possessive urges. 
 Dharma-Dhyana, "virtuous" or "customary", refers to knowledge of the soul, the non-soul and the universe. Over time this became associated with discriminating knowledge (bheda-vijñāna) of the tattvas (truths or fundamental principles). 
 Sukla-Dhyana (pure or white), divided into (1) Multiple contemplation, (pṛthaktva-vitarka-savicāra); (2) Unitary contemplation, (aikatva-vitarka-nirvicāra); (3) Subtle infallible physical activity (sūkṣma-kriyā-pratipāti); and (4) Irreversible stillness of the soul (vyuparata-kriyā-anivarti). The first two are said to require knowledge of the lost Jain scriptures known as purvas and thus it is considered by some Jains that pure meditation was no longer possible. The other two forms are said in the Tattvartha sutra to be only accessible to Kevalins (enlightened ones).

This broad definition of the term dhyana means that it signifies any state of deep concentration, with good or bad results. Later texts like Umaswati's Tattvārthasūtra and Jinabhadra's Dhyana-Sataka (sixth century) also discusses these four dhyanas. This system seems to be uniquely Jain.

During this era, a key text was the Tattvarthasutra by Acharya Umāsvāti which codified Jain doctrine. According to the Tattvarthasutra, yoga is the sum of all the activities of mind, speech and body. Umāsvāti (fl. sometime between the 2nd and 5th-century CE) calls yoga the cause of "asrava" or karmic influx as well as one of the essentials—samyak caritra—in the path to liberation. Umāsvāti prescribed a threefold path of yoga: right conduct/austerity, right knowledge, right faith. Umāsvāti also defined a series of fourteen stages of spiritual development (guṇasthāna), into which he embedded the four fold description of dhyana. These stages culminate in the pure activities of body, speech, and mind (sayogi-kevala), and the "cessation of all activity" (ayogi-kevala). Umāsvāti also defined meditation in a new way (as ‘ekāgra-cintā’): “Concentration of thought on a single object by a person with good bone-joints is meditation which lasts an intra-hour (ā-muhūrta)”Other important figures are Jinabhadra, and Pujyapada Devanandi (wrote the commentary Sarvārthasiddhi). Sagarmal Jain notes that during the canonical age of Jaina meditation, one finds strong analogues with the 8 limbs of Patanjali Yoga, including the yamas and niyamas, through often under different names. Sagarmal also notes that during this period the Yoga systems of Jainism, Buddhism and Patanjali Yoga had many similarities.

In spite of this literature, Dundas claims that Jainism never “fully developed a culture of true meditative contemplation,” he further states that later Jaina writers discussed meditation more out of “theoretical interest.”

Post-canonical 
This period saw new texts specifically on Jain meditation and further Hindu influences on Jain yoga. Ācārya Haribhadra in the 8th century wrote the meditation compendium called Yogadṛṣṭisamuccya which discusses systems of Jain yoga, Patanjali Yoga and Buddhist yoga and develops his own unique system that are somewhat similar to these. Ācārya Haribhadra assimilated many elements from Patañjali’s Yoga-sūtra into his new Jain yoga (which also has eight parts) and composed four texts on this topic, Yoga-bindu, Yogadṛṣṭisamuccaya, Yoga-śataka and Yoga-viṅśikā. Johannes Bronkhorst considers Haribhadra's contributions a "far more drastic departure from the scriptures." He worked with a different definition of yoga than previous Jains, defining yoga as "that which connects to liberation" and his works allowed Jainism to compete with other religious systems of yoga.

The first five stages of Haribhadra's yoga system are preparatory and include posture and so on. The sixth stage is kāntā [pleasing] and is similar to Patañjali's "Dhāraṇā." It is defined as "a higher concentration for the sake of compassion toward others. Pleasure is never found in externals and a beneficial reflection arises. In this state, due to the efficacy of dharma, one’s conduct becomes purified. One is beloved among beings and single-mindedly devoted to dharma. (YSD, 163) With mind always fixed on scriptural dharma."  The seventh stage is radiance (prabhā), a state of calmness, purification and happiness as well as "the discipline of conquering amorous passion, the emergence of strong discrimination, and the power of constant serenity." The final stage of meditation in this system is 'the highest' (parā), a "state of Samadhi in which one becomes free from all attachments and attains liberation." Haribhadra sees this as being in "the category of “ayoga” (motionlessness), a state which we can compare with the state just prior to liberation."

Acarya Haribhadra (as well as the later thinker Hemacandra) also mentions the five major vows of ascetics and 12 minor vows of laity under yoga. This has led certain Indologists like Prof. Robert J. Zydenbos to call Jainism, essentially, a system of yogic thinking that grew into a full-fledged religion. The five yamas or the constraints of the Yoga Sutras of Patanjali bear a resemblance to the five major vows of Jainism, indicating a history of strong cross-fertilization between these traditions.

Later works also provide their own definitions of meditation. The Sarvārthasiddhi of Akalanka (9 th c. CE) states "only the knowledge that shines like an unflickering flame is meditation." According to Samani Pratibha Pragya, the Tattvānuśāsana of Ramasena (10th c. CE) states that this knowledge is "many-pointed concentration (vyagra) and meditation is one-pointed concentration (ekāgra)."

Tantric 

This period sees tantric influences on Jain meditation, which can be gleaned in the Jñānārṇava of Śubhacandra (11thc. CE), and the Yogaśāstra of Hemacandra (12th c. CE). Śubhacandra offered a new model of four meditations:

 Meditation on the corporeal body (piṇḍstha), which also includes five concentrations (dhāraṇā): on the earth element (pārthivī), the fire element (āgneyī), the air element (śvasanā/ mārutī), the water element (vāruṇī) and the fifth related to the non-material self (tattvrūpavatī).
 Meditation on mantric syllables (padastha);
 Meditation on the forms of the arhat (rūpastha);
 Meditation on the pure formless self (rūpātīta).

Śubhacandra also discusses breath control and withdrawal of the mind. Modern scholars such as Mahāprajña have noted that this system of yoga already existed in Śaiva tantra and that Śubhacandara developed his system based on the Navacakreśvara-tantra and that this system is also present in Abhinavagupta’s Tantrāloka.

The Yogaśāstra of Hemacandra (12th c. CE) closely follows the model of Śubhacandra. This trend of adopting ideas from the Brāhmaṇical and tantric Śaiva traditions continues with the work of the later Śvetāmbara upādhyāya Yaśovijaya (1624–1688), who wrote many works on yoga.

During the 17th century, Ācārya Vinayavijaya composed the Śānta-sudhārasabhāvanā in Sanskrit which teaches sixteen anuprekṣā, or contemplations.

Modern history 

The growth and popularity of mainstream Yoga and Hindu meditation practices influenced a revival in various Jain communities, especially in the Śvētāmbara Terapanth order. These systems sought to "promote health and well-being and pacifism, via meditative practices as “secular” nonreligious tools." 20th century Jain meditation systems were promoted as universal systems accessible to all, drawing on modern elements, using new vocabulary designed to appeal to the lay community, whether Jains or non-Jains. It is important to note that these developments happened mainly among Śvētāmbara sects, while Digambara groups generally did not develop new modernist meditation systems. Digambara sects instead promote the practice of self-study (Svādhyāya) as a form of meditation, influenced by the work of Kundakunda. This practice of self study (reciting scriptures and thinking about the meaning) is included in the practice of equanimity (sāmāyika) which is the spiritual practice emphasized by 20th century Digambara sects.

The Digambara Jain scholar Kundakunda, in his Pravacanasara states that a Jain mendicant should meditate on "I, the pure self". Anyone who considers his body or possessions as "I am this, this is mine" is on the wrong road, while one who meditates, thinking the antithesis and "I am not others, they are not mine, I am one knowledge" is on the right road to meditating on the "soul, the pure self".

Terāpanth prekṣā-dhyāna 
The modern era saw the rise of a new Śvētāmbara sect, the Śvētāmbara Terapanth, founded by Ācārya Bhikṣu, who was said to be able to practice breath retention (hold his breath) for two hours. He also practiced ātāpanā by sitting under the scorching sun for hours while chanting and visualizing yantras. Further Terapanth scholars like Jayācārya wrote on various meditation practices, including a devotional visualization of the tīrthaṅkaras in various colors and “awareness of breathing” (sāsā-surat), this influenced the later “perception of breathing” (śvāsa–prekṣā) and the meditation on auras (leśyā-dhyāna) of Ācārya Mahāprajña.

Tulasī (1913–1997) and Ācārya Mahāprajña (1920– 2010) developed a system termed prekṣā-dhyāna which is a combination of ancient wisdom and modern science. it is based on Jain Canons. It included "meditative techniques of perception,Kayotsarg, Anupreksha,mantra, posture (āsana), breath control (prāṇāyāma), hand and body gestures (mudrā), various bodily locks (bandha), meditation (dhyāna) and reflection (bhāvanā)."  The scholar of religion Andrea Jain states that she was convinced that Mahāprajña and others across the world were attempting "to attract people to preksha dhyana by making it intersect with the global yoga market".

The key texts of this meditation system are Prekṣā-Dhyāna: Ādhāra aura Svarūpa (Prekṣā Meditation: Basis and Form, 1980), Prekṣā-Dhyāna: Prayoga aura Paddhatti (Prekṣā Meditation: Theory and Practice, 2010) and Prekṣā-Dhyāna: Darśana aura Prayoga (Prekṣā Meditation: Philosophy and Practice, 2011).  Despite the innovations, the meditation system is said to be firmly grounded in the classic Jain metaphysical mind body dualism in which the self (jiva, characterized by consciousness, cetana which consists of knowledge, jñāna and intuition, darśana) is covered over by subtle and gross bodies.

Prekṣā means "to perceive carefully and profoundly". In prekṣā, perception always means an impartial experience bereft of the duality of like and dislike, pleasure and pain, attachment or aversion. Meditative progress proceeds through the different gross and subtle bodies, differentiating between them and the pure consciousness of jiva. Mahāprajña interprets the goal of this to mean to “perceive and realise the most subtle aspects of consciousness by your conscious mind (mana).” Important disciplines in the system are - Synchrony of mental and physical actions or simply present mindedness or complete awareness of one's actions, disciplining the reacting attitude, friendliness, diet, silence, spiritual vigilance.

The mature prekṣā system is taught using an eight limb hierarchical schema, where each one is necessary for practicing the next:

 Relaxation (kāyotsarga), abandonment of the body, also “relaxation (śithilīkaraṇa) with self-awareness,” allows vital force (prāṇa) to flow.
 Internal Journey (antaryātrā), this is based on the practice of directing the flow of vital energy (prāṇa-śakti) in an upward direction, interpreted as being connected with the nervous system.
 Perception of Breathing (śvāsaprekon), of two types: (1) perception of long or deep breathing (dīrgha-śvāsa-prekṣā) and (2) perception of breathing through alternate nostrils (samavṛtti-śvāsa-prekṣā).
 Perception of Body (śarīraprekṣā), one becomes aware of the gross physical body (audārika-śarīra), the fiery body (taijasa-śarīra) and karmic body (karmaṇa-śarīra), this practice allows one to perceive the self through the body.
 Perception of Psychic Centres (caitanyakendra-prekṣā), defined as locations in the subtle body that contain ‘dense consciousness’ (saghana-cetanā), which  Mahāprajña maps into the endocrine system.
 Perception of Psychic Colors (leśyā-dhyāna), these are subtle consciousness radiations of the soul, which can be malevolent or benevolent and can be transformed.
 Auto-Suggestion (bhāvanā), Mahāprajña defines bhāvanā as “repeated verbal reflection”, infusing the psyche (citta) with ideas through strong resolve and generating "counter-vibrations" which eliminate evil impulses.
 Contemplation (anuprekṣā), contemplations are combined with the previous steps of dhyana in different ways. The contemplations can often be secular in nature.

A few important contemplation themes are - Impermanence, Solitariness, and Vulnerability. Regular practice is believed to strengthen the immune system and build up stamina to resist against aging, pollution, viruses, diseases. Meditation practice is an important part of the daily lives of the religion's monks.

Mahāprajña also taught subsidiary limbs to prekṣā-dhyāna which would help support the meditations in a holistic manner, these are Prekṣā-yoga (posture and breathing control) and Prekṣā-cikitsā (therapy). Mantras such as Arham are also used in this system.

Other traditions 

Citrabhānu (b. 1922) was a Jain monk who moved to the West in 1971, and founded the first Jain meditation center in the world, the Jaina Meditation International Centre in New York City. He eventually married and became a lay teacher of a new system called "Jain meditation" (JM), on which he wrote various books. The core of his system consists of three steps (tripadī): 1. who am I? (kohum), 2. I am not that (nahum) (not non-self), 3. I am that (sohum) (I am the self). He also makes use of classic Jain meditations such as the twelve reflections (thought taught in a more optimistic, modern way), Jaina mantras, meditation on the seven chakras, as well as Hatha Yoga techniques.

Ācārya Suśīlakumāra (1926–1994) of the Sthānakavāsī tradition founded “Arhum Yoga” (Yoga on Omniscient) and established a Jain community called the “Arhat Saṅgha” in New Jersey in 1974. His meditation system is strongly tantric and employs mantras (mainly the namaskār), nyasa, visualization and chakras.

The Sthānakavāsī Ācārya Nānālāla (1920–1999), developed a Jaina meditation called Samīkṣaṇa-dhyāna (looking at thoroughly, close investigation) in 1981. The main goal of samīkṣaṇa-dhyāna is the experience of higher consciousness within the self and liberation in this life. Samīkṣaṇa-dhyāna is classified into two categories: introspection of the passions (kaṣāya samīkṣaṇa) and samatā-samīkṣaṇa, which includes introspection of the senses (indriya samīkṣaṇa), introspection of the vow (vrata samīkṣaṇa) introspection of the karma (karma samīkṣaṇa), introspection of the Self (ātma samīkṣaṇa) and others.

Bhadraṅkaravijaya (1903–1975) of the Tapāgaccha sect founded  “Sālambana Dhyāna” (Support Meditation). According to Samani Pratibha Pragya, most of these practices "seem to be a deritualisation of pūjā in a meditative form, i.e. he recommended the mental performance of pūjā." These practices (totally 34 different meditations) focus on meditating on arihantas and can make use of mantras, hymns (stotra), statues (mūrti) and diagrams (yantra). 

Ācārya Śivamuni (b. 1942) of the Śramaṇa Saṅgha is known for his contribution of “Ātma Dhyāna” (Self-Meditation). The focus in this system is directly meditating on the nature of the self, making use of the mantra so’ham and using the Acaranga sutra as the main doctrinal source.

Muni Candraprabhasāgara (b. 1962) introduced “Sambodhi Dhyāna” (Enlightenment-Meditation) in 1997. It mainly makes use of the mantra Om, breathing meditation, the chakras and other yogic practices.

Sāmāyika 

The name Sāmāyika, the term for Jain meditation, is derived from the term samaya "time" in Prakrit. Jains also use samayika to denote the practice of meditation. The aim of Sāmāyika is to transcend our daily experiences as the "constantly changing" human beings, called Jiva, and allow identification with the "changeless" reality in practitioner, called the atman. One of the main goals of Sāmāyika is to inculcate equanimity, to see all the events equanimously. It encourages to be consistently spiritually vigilant. Sāmāyika is practiced in all the Jain sects and communities. Samayika is an important practice during Paryushana, a special eight- or ten-day period.

For householders 
In Jainism, six essential duties are prescribed for a śrāvaka (householder), out of which one duty is Samayika. These help the laity in achieving the principle of ahimsa which is necessary for his/her spiritual upliftment. The sāmayika vrata (vow to meditate) is intended to be observed three times a day if possible; other-wise at least once daily. Its objective is to enable the śrāvaka to abstain from all kinds of sins during the period of time fixed for its observance. The usual duration of the sāmayika vow is an antara mūharta (a period of time not exceeding 48 minutes).  During this period, which the layman spends in study and meditation, he vows to refrain from the commission of the five kinds of sin — injury, falsehood, theft, unchastity and love of material possessions in any of the three ways. These three ways are:-
by an act of mind, speech or body (krita), 
inciting others to commit such an act (kārita),
approving the commission of such an act by others (anumodanā).

In performing sāmayika the śrāvaka has to stand facing north or east and bow to the Pañca-Parameṣṭhi. He then sit down and recites the Namokara mantra a certain number of times, and finally devotes himself to holy meditation. This consists in:
pratikramana, recounting the sins committed and repenting for them, 
pratyākhyanā, resolving to avoid particular sins in future, 
sāmayika karma, renunciation of personal attachments, and the cultivation of a feeling of regarding every body and thing alike, 
stuti, praising the four and twenty Tīrthankaras, 
vandanā, devotion to a particular Tirthankara, and 
kāyotsarga, withdrawal of attention from the body (physical personality) and becoming absorbed in the contemplation of the spiritual Self.
Sāmayika can be performed anywhere- a temple, private residence, forest and the like. But the place shouldn't be open to disturbance. According to the Jain text, Ratnakaranda śrāvakācāra, while performing sāmayika, one should meditate on:

For ascetics 
The ascetic has to perform the sāmāyika three times a day. Champat Rai Jain in his book, The Key of Knowledge wrote:

Techniques
According to the some commonly practiced yoga systems, high concentration is reached by meditating in an easy (preferably lotus) posture in seclusion and staring without blinking at the rising sun, a point on the wall, or the tip of the nose, and as long as one can keep the mind away from the outer world, this strengthens concentration. Garuda is the name Jainism gives to the yoga of self-discipline and discipline of mind, body and speech, so that even earth, water, fire and air can come under one’s control. Śiva is in Jainism control over the passions and the acquisition of such self-discipline that under all circumstances equanimity is maintained.

Prānayāma – breathing exercises – are performed to strengthen the flows of life energy. Through this, the elements of the constitution – earth, water, fire and air – are also strengthened. At the same time the five chakras are controlled. Prānayāma also helps to stabilize one’s thinking and leads to unhampered direct experience of the events around us.

Next one practices pratyāhāra. Pratyāhāra means that one directs the senses away from the enjoyment of sensual and mental objects. The senses are part of the nervous system, and their task is to send data to the brain through which the mind as well as the soul is provided with information. The mind tends to enjoy this at the cost of the soul as well as the body. Pratyāhāra is obtained by focusing the mind on one point for the purpose of receiving impulses: on the eyes, ears, tip of the nose, the brow, the navel, the head, the heart or the palate.

Contemplation is an important wing in Jain meditation. The practitioner meditates or reflects deeply on subtle facts or philosophical aspects. The first type is Agnya vichāya, in which one meditates deeply on the seven elementary facts - life and non-life, the inflow, bondage, stoppage and removal of karmas, and the final accomplishment of liberation. The second is Apaya vichāya, in which incorrect insights and behavior in which “sleeping souls” indulge, are reflected upon. The third is Vipaka vichāya dharma dhyāna, in which one reflects on the eight causes or basic types of karma. The fourth is Sansathan vichāya dharma dhyāna, when one thinks about the vastness of the universe and the loneliness of the soul, which has had to face the results of its own causes all alone. A few important contemplation themes in Preksha meditation are - Impermanence, Solitariness, Vulnerability.

In pindāstha-dhyāna one imagines oneself sitting all alone in the middle of a vast ocean of milk on a lotus flower, meditating on the soul. There are no living beings around whatsoever. The lotus is identical to Jambūdvīpa, with Mount Meru as its stalk. Next the meditator imagines a 16-petalled lotus at the level of his navel, and on each petal are printed the (Sanskrit) letters “arham“ and also an inverted lotus of 8 petals at the location of his heart. Suddenly the lotus on which one is seated flares up at the navel and flames gradually rise up to the inverted lotus, burning its petals with a rising golden flame which not only burns his or her body, but also the inverted lotus at the heart. The flames rise further up to the throat whirling in the shape of a swastika and then reach the head, burning it entirely, while taking the form of a three-sided pyramid of golden flames above the head, piercing the skull sharp end straight up. The whole physical body is charred, and everything turns into glowing ashes. Thus the pinda or body is burnt off and the pure soul survives. Then suddenly a strong wind blows off all the ashes; and one imagines that a heavy rain shower washes all the ashes away, and the pure soul remains seated on the lotus. That pure Soul has infinite virtues, it is Myself. Why should I get polluted at all? One tries to remain in his purest nature. This is called pindāstha dhyāna, in which one ponders the reality of feeling and experiencing.

In padāstha dhyāna one focuses on some mantras, words or themes. Couple of important mantra examples are, OM - it signifies remembrance of the five classes of spiritual beings (the embodied and non-embodied Jinas, the ascetics, the monks and the nuns), pronouncing the word “Arham” makes one feel “I myself am the omniscient soul” and one tries to improve one’s character accordingly. One may also pronounce the holy name of an arhat and concentrate on the universal richness of the soul.

In rūpāstha dhyāna one reflects on the embodiments of arihants, the svayambhuva (the self-realized), the omniscients and other enlightened people and their attributes, such as three umbrellas and whiskers – as seen in many icons – unconcerned about one’s own body, but almighty and benevolent to all living beings, destroyer of attachment, enmity, etc. Thus the meditator as a human being concentrates his or her attention on the virtues of the omniscients to acquire the same virtues for himself.

Rūpātita dhyāna is a meditation in which one focuses on bodiless objects such as the liberated souls or siddhas, which stand individually and collectively for the infinite qualities that such souls have earned. That omniscient, potent, omnipresent, liberated and untainted soul is called a nirañjāna, and this stage can be achieved by right vision, right knowledge and right conduct only. Right vision, right knowledge and right conduct begin the fourth stage of the 14-fold path.

The ultimate aim of such yoga and meditation is to pave the way for the spiritual elevation and salvation of the soul. Some yogis develop their own methods for meditation.

See also
 Buddhist meditation
 Hindu meditation
 Jewish meditation
 Christian meditation
 Muraqaba
 Daoist meditation

References

Notes

Citations

Sources

External links

Meditation
Meditation